University College Dublin Association Football Club, known commonly as UCD, is the football team of University College Dublin. They play in the League of Ireland Premier Division. Founded in 1895, the club was elected to the League of Ireland in 1979 under the management of Dr. Tony O'Neill. Since the 2008 season they have played at the UCD Bowl, also home to the college's rugby team. 'The Students' play in sky blue and navy. Their reserve and freshers teams play in the Leinster Senior League.

History

Foundation and early years
University College Dublin AFC was founded in 1895 as the Catholic University Medical School Football Club, and began playing regular games the following year. A First XI played college games against other universities and a Second XI entered outside competitions. The club was founder members of the Leinster Junior League in 1896 and reached the semi-finals of the Leinster Senior Cup in 1897. The club became University College Dublin AFC when the new university annexed the Medical school in 1908. UCD won the inaugural Intervarsities competition, the Collingwood Cup, in 1914 and added the Irish Intermediate Cup the following year, beating Portadown 2–1 in a replayed final. When the Irish Free State was formed in 1921 and the new Football Association of Ireland was formed, UCD participated in the FAI Cup preliminary round against fellow non-League team Shamrock Rovers, losing 6–2 in Windy Arbour. UCD were invited to join the League of Ireland in 1922, but had to turn it down on the basis of not being able to field a team in the League of Ireland Shield in September as the Academic year didn't commence until October. In 1945 they won the FAI Intermediate Cup when beating fellow future League of Ireland members Cobh Ramblers 4–2 in the final. UCD appeared in the FAI Cup in the 1930s, 1940s and 1950s, their final appearance as a non-League outfit coming in 1957 when Cork Athletic beat UCD 4–2 in the Mardyke.

1970s

In 1970 the club was elected to the League of Ireland B Division.   From 1976, they embarked on a series of landmark tours, becoming the first western football team to play in China, and following that with tours in places like India, Hong Kong, Taiwan, Malaysia, Jordan, Philippines, Macao, the United States, Sudan, Kenya and Australia. A second invitation to join the League of Ireland was accepted on 22 July 1979, when Cork Celtic were expelled for not having their financial affairs in order. Their first competitive game as a senior club was on 26 August, when they lost 2–1 to Drogheda United in the FAI League Cup. Theo Dunne was appointed first team coach, and apart from a brief spell at Home Farm 1990–1994, he was in charge of first team affairs until he retired as coach in 2001. Dr. Tony O'Neill, who was General Manager when the club joined the League, remained in that role until his untimely death from cancer in October 1999.

1980s
The club struggled initially in the league after their election, never finishing higher than twelfth in the 16-team league, although they did win the Leinster Senior Cup in December 1980, beating St Patrick's Athletic 2–1 in the final. However, important changes within the club in 1983 marked a dramatic upturn in fortunes. The previously amateur club turned semi-pro, and players outside of the college were allowed to represent the first team. This is still the situation today, although in practice most of the players are either students or ex-students. By the end of the 1983–84 season, UCD had won the FAI Cup, beating Shamrock Rovers 2–1 after a replay. Shamrock Rovers weren't to lose another game in the competition for over three years – until they lost to UCD in 1988.

That win saw UCD qualify for European competition – the European Cup Winners Cup – for the first time. The draw pitted them against Everton, then one of the leading sides in England and boasting players of the calibre of Neville Southall, Kevin Sheedy, Graham Sharp, Peter Reid and Andy Gray. The home leg was played in Tolka Park and a crowd of 9,000 – many times UCD's average league crowd – saw the Students come away with a scarcely believable 0–0 draw. Another remarkable performance was to follow two weeks later as a solitary Graham Sharp goal gave Everton a 1–0 win. Joe Hanrahan skimmed the bar for the Students late on; had he scored, UCD would have progressed on away goals – as it was, Everton went on to win the entire competition, and smashed several records in winning their nation's league title. UCD's performance was made all the more remarkable by the fact that at the end of the year Everton were voted the best club side in the World for 1985, by the managers of world national teams.

That season saw UCD finish fourth in the league, but they were then forced to release many of their best players due to financial difficulties. Joe Hanrahan signed for Manchester United for IR£30,000, Ken O'Doherty moved to Crystal Palace and Alan O'Neill left for Dundalk. The team were relegated in 1985/86 with eight points, a record low in the Premier Division. Despite this, in 1987, UCD won the World Collegiate Championships in Las Cruces, New Mexico.

Promotion in 1988–89 was followed by an immediate relegation, and it was 1994–95 before UCD were to return to the Premier. They did so by recording a then record points tally for the First Division, also breaking the record for most goals scored and fewest goals conceded.

1990s
In 1999–00, a late burst saw UCD finish fourth in the league and qualify for the Intertoto Cup. Their opponents were the Bulgarian side PFC Velbazhd Kyustendil, who boasted a couple of full Bulgaria internationals, including Ilian Stoyanov, who would go on to represent his country in the 2004 European Championships. UCD kept up their proud European record with a pulsating 3–3 draw in the first leg in Belfield Park, before drawing 0–0 in Bulgaria to bow out on away goals. History unfortunately repeated itself as the Students once again nearly sneaked victory as they hit the post late on.

2000–2009

In 2001, Paul Doolin, one of the most successful players in the League of Ireland, took over as manager from former player Martin Moran. After enjoying a successful first season, the team only just avoided relegation in 2002–03 and were eleven points adrift when Doolin left to take over at Drogheda United in September 2003. Pete Mahon was immediately installed as the new manager, and UCD almost staged an incredible Houdini act, losing four games in 16, closing the gap at the bottom to two points and recording the highest points total for a relegated team.

2004 saw more of the same, as UCD, together with Finn Harps, smashed the First Division points record and were promoted with ease. UCD marked their return to the Premier Division with a highly creditable 1–1 draw away to two-time reigning champions Shelbourne. There was a bright point in College's ultimately indifferent season when they got into the League Cup final after a last-gasp 2–1 victory over Shelbourne in the semi-final at Tolka Park. They went on to lose the final 2–1 to Derry City at Belfield Park.

2006 was one of UCD's most successful seasons in a few years. Despite being knocked out of the League Cup in the first round, The Students recovered well, finishing the season in 6th place and reaching the quarter-finals of the FAI Cup. The performances of many in the squad did not go unnoticed, with Darren Quigley and Gary Dicker establishing themselves as under-21 internationals. Quigley then went one better and became on B international, when he appeared as a substitute against Scotland B in November. UCD players also attracted interest from many British clubs. Quigley had trials at many clubs across the water, Stockport County paid €56,000 for Dicker in May 2007 and Patrick Kavanagh signed for Birmingham City after impressing on trial there. The club were relegated at the end of the 2008 season and Manager Pete Mahon wasn't offered a new contract.

2009–present

Mahon's assistant since 2005 Martin Russell took over as manager. With a largely new team, UCD bounced back to the top flight of Irish football at the first time of asking by securing their second First Division title, promoted after a 5–0 away win over Athlone Town in the penultimate match of the season on 30 October 2009, ahead of former Premier Division teams Shelbourne, Longford Town, Waterford United FC as well as a strong challenge from recently formed Sporting Fingal FC.   In the 2009 FAI Cup, UCD's second team qualified for the first round by virtue of reaching the final of the 2008/09 FAI Intermediate Cup.   They lost 2–1 at home to Arklow Town, who were drawn to play UCD's first team in the second round, also in the UCD Bowl.   Despite taking the lead, Arklow, who had no eligible goalkeeper for the tie, ultimately lost 3–1.

Under Russell, UCD remained in the Airtricity League Premier Division.  In 2011 the club qualified for the Setanta Sports Cup, an All-Ireland competition, where they lost to Lisburn Distillery FC 2–0 over two legs.  At the beginning of the 2014 season Russell was replaced by former coach Aaron Callaghan, who had to serve out a five-game dug-out suspension awarded while at rivals Bohemian FC. UCD struggled all year and the Students lost a two-legged relegation/promotion play-off with Galway FC in November 2014.

In July 2015, UCD became the first League of Ireland team from the second tier to progress through a European tie when they saw off Luxembourg champions F91 Dudelange in the Europa League.  A lone Ryan Swan strike at the UCD Bowl gave the college their first win in a European game, and then a remarkable game at the Stade Jos Nosbaum saw Swan give UCD the lead early in the game, but after Seán Coyne was sent off, F91 scored twice before half-time through Joël Pedro and Kevin Nakache. UCD players put up the most incredible defensive display of the season led by goalkeeper Niall Corbet and kept the second half scoreless to progress on away goals after a 2–2 aggregate draw, winning on the away goals rule. In the second round, UCD lost to a late deflected goal away to a Slovan Bratislava with three players who had played at the 2010 FIFA World Cup, before losing the return leg 5–1, conceding three goals in the last ten minutes.

In 2017, the club competed in the UEFA Youth League, losing on penalties to a Molde FK which included Erling Haaland.   Haaland was introduced as a sub in the return game in the Aker Stadion and didn't score in his half-hour on the pitch, although he did score in the penalty shoot-out.

In September 2018 the club won promotion to the Premier Division after a 1–1 draw with Finn Harps F.C which secured the Students the title. They also reached the semi-finals of the FAI Cup for the first time in 12 years only to lose 1–0 away to reigning double-champions Dundalk.   However, a tumultuous 2019 season saw a number of players leave mid-season as they had finished college.   A club record 12 consecutive defeats were followed by a record 10–1 defeat away to Bohemians, a match which brought about the end of Collie O'Neill's five years in charge.   The club were relegated back to the First Division for 2020.

After finishing third in the table in the 2021 League of Ireland First Division, UCD defeated Treaty United and Bray Wanderers in the First Division play-offs before defeating Waterford FC 2-1 in the promotion/relegation play-off to win promotion back to the 2022 League of Ireland Premier Division.

In the 2022 League of Ireland Premier Division, UCD spent most of the season battling with Finn Harps to avoid automatic relegation. It was 15 games into the season before UCD managed their first win of the season, a 1-0 win away to Finn Harps. However, a strong finish to the season and a 3-1 win away to Finn Harps in the penultimate game of the season ensured that UCD finished in 9th place and avoided automatic relegation to the First Division, instead qualifying for the promotion/relegation playoff where they faced Waterford FC in a repeat of the 2021 playoff. A 15th minute goal by Tom Lonergan, his 7th of the season, led UCD to a 1-0 win and ensured their survival in the Premier Division.

Scholarship scheme
UCD AFC is noted for its highly regarded scholarship scheme, which gives players the chance to combine senior football with the opportunity to earn a college degree. This was based on the North American model and created in 1979 on UCD's entry into the League of Ireland Senior Division. The first recipient of the award was Keith Dignam, sponsored by Irish Potato Crisp manufacturer Tayto.  Past scholars include Kevin Grogan, Joe Hanrahan and his brother Peter Hanrahan, Jason Colwell, Jason Sherlock, Clive Delaney, Gary Dicker, Paul Corry and Robbie Benson.

Former players

Many famous players have played for UCD down the years. Todd Andrews, future Chairman of CIÉ and RTÉ, and his son David Andrews, a future Minister for Foreign Affairs, both played in the Leinster Senior League for the club, as did Brian Lenihan, who scored in a 1953 FAI Cup tie against Sligo Rovers and later ran for President of Ireland. Willie Browne won numerous international university caps while at UCD, he subsequently went on to win 3 full Republic of Ireland caps, 16 amateur caps, one Republic of Ireland B cap and six Inter-League caps and captained Bohemian for 3 consecutive seasons.   Former Irish international Kevin Moran, who would later play for Manchester United, Sporting de Gijón and Blackburn Rovers played in the League of Ireland B Division and was signed for Manchester United from UCD's graduate team, Pegasus. Moran also won an All-Ireland Gaelic football winner's medal with Dublin in 1976 while at UCD, as would Jason Sherlock nineteen years later. Conor Sammon, Enda Stevens and Andy Boyle also won senior international caps having started their careers with UCD.

Hugo MacNeill won the Collingwood with UCD, but went on to greater things with the Ireland national rugby union team, winning the Triple Crown in 1985 and playing in the 1987 Rugby World Cup in New Zealand.   In 1983, the Leeds United legend and record goalscorer Peter Lorimer played three games before returning to England for a final spell with Leeds. Dave Norman played senior international football for Canada while at UCD and went on to play in the 1986 World Cup.   Former Sky Sports and current Setanta Sports pundit Paul Dempsey played for one season in 1982/83 before taking up a job with the BBC

Gavin Whelan (nephew of Ronnie Whelan) and Pat Jennings (son of Northern Irish international Pat Jennings) played for UCD in the mid-2000s. In August 2016, Dylan Watts signed for English Premiership champions Leicester City from UCD.

A popular rumour has it that Brazilian star Sócrates ever played for the club; however, there is no evidence for this.

Fan culture
UCD has a small fanbase, which included until his untimely death the Father Ted actor Dermot Morgan, an occasional visitor to Belfield. When asked why he attended UCD matches, Dermot reportedly replied "Because I hate crowds".
From 2001 to 2010, the unofficial club fanzine Student Till I Graduate published a record 91 issues.   The book One Night in Dudelange – Adventures in the UEFA Europa League chronicles the club's 2015 Europa League campaign and was listed for Sports Book of the Year in 2019.

The UCD Superleague is an inter-varsity league consisting of teams predominantly made up of UCD students and alumni. The league has produced a handful of UCD and other League of Ireland players.

European record
Correct as of 18 October 2017

Overview

Matches
Senior

Youth

Notes
 1R: First round
 1Q: First qualifying round

Players

Current squad

Notable former players
Current players excluded. Some players spanned several decades, they are placed in the decade they made their debut for UCD.

1920s
 Todd Andrews
 Ernie Crawford
1930s
 Morgan Crowe
1950s
 David Andrews
 Willie Browne
 Brian Lenihan
1960s
 Ollie Byrne
1970s
 Kevin Moran
 Hugo MacNeill
1980s
 David Norman
 Joe Hanrahan
 Dermot Keely
 Ken O'Doherty
 Alan O'Neill
 Peter Lorimer

1990s
 Clive Delaney
 Ciarán Martyn
 Tony McDonnell
 Barry Ryan
 Jason Sherlock
2000s
 Ian Bermingham
 Andy Boyle
 Conan Byrne
 Alan Cawley
 Paul Corry
 Gary Dicker
 Ronan Finn
 Ciarán Kilduff
 Shane McFaul
 David McMillan
 Evan McMillan
 Conor Sammon
 Enda Stevens
 Derek Swan
2010s
 Robbie Benson
 Ayman Ben Mohamed
 Dylan Watts
 Simon Power
 Jason Byrne
 Kaleem Simon
 Gary O'Neill
 Greg Sloggett
 Dáire O'Connor
 Liam Scales
 Georgie Kelly
 Jason McClelland
 Liam Kerrigan

Current technical staff

Honours
First Team
FAI Cup: 1 
 1983–84
FAI Super Cup: 1
 2000–01
League of Ireland First Division: 3 
 1994–95, 2009, 2018
League of Ireland First Division Shield: 2 
 1991–92, 1994–95
Leinster Senior Cup: 3
 1980–81, 1994–95, 1995–96
FAI Intermediate Cup: 1 
 1944–45
Irish Intermediate Cup: 1
 1914–15

Reserve team
League of Ireland B Division: 1
 1997–98 
A Championship: 2
 2008, 2010

Youth team
Dr Tony O'Neill Cup: 5
 2004, 2005, 2007, 2009, 2016
Enda McGuill Cup: 1
 2014–15

Intervarsity
Collingwood Cup: 47
 1914,1921, 1922, 1924, 1925, 1926, 1927, 1928, 1930, 1936, 1937, 1938, 1941, 1943, 1944, 1945, 1946, 1948, 1949, 1950, 1951, 1952, 1953, 1954, 1956, 1958, 1959, 1961, 1969, 1972, 1973, 1976, 1981, 1983, 1984, 1987, 1988, 1989, 1992, 1993, 1994, 2007, 2009, 2010, 2012, 2013, 2016, 2018, 2022 [Collingwood Cup Brochure]
Harding Cup: 17
 1971, 1974, 1977, 1978, 1979, 1987, 1991, 1996, 1998, 2001, 2003, 2005, 2006, 2007, 2010, 2013, 2014, 2016
Farquhar Cup: 1
 2012

Club records

Most senior appearances for UCD AFC

(Players in bold still playing for UCD)

Most senior goals scored for UCD AFC

(Players in bold still playing for UCD)

Record wins

Record defeats

Highest aggregate scores

UCD AFC Supporters' Player of the Year

List of UCD seasons

Notes

Managers
 Ronnie Nolan (–1979)
 Dr Tony O'Neill (1979–83)
 Dermot Keely(1983 Player manager July–November)
 Theo Dunne (1983–90)
 Dr Tony O'Neill (1990–94) General Manager 1979-1999
 Theo Dunne (1994–99)
 Martin Moran (1999–2001)
 Paul Doolin (2001–03)
 Pete Mahon (Sept 15, 2003–Jan 12, 2009)
 Martin Russell (13 Jan 2009 – Oct 2013)
 Aaron Callaghan (November 2013-October 2014)
 Collie O'Neill (2015–August 2019)
 Maciej Tarnogrodzki (August 2019–December 2019)
 Andy Myler (2020-)

Footnotes

External links
 UCD AFC website

 
Association football clubs established in 1895
Association football clubs in Dún Laoghaire–Rathdown
Football
Belfield, Dublin
University and college association football clubs in the Republic of Ireland
League of Ireland Premier Division clubs
1895 establishments in Ireland
Former League of Ireland First Division clubs
League of Ireland B Division clubs
Leinster Senior League (association football) clubs